March 27 - Eastern Orthodox liturgical calendar - March 29

All fixed commemorations below are observed on April 10 by Orthodox Churches on the Old Calendar.

For March 28th, Orthodox Churches on the Old Calendar commemorate the Saints listed on March 15.

Saints

 Apostle Herodion of Patras of the Seventy Apostles (1st century)
 Martyrs Priscus, Malchus, and Alexander, of Caesarea of Palestine (259)
 Martyrs Jonah and Barachisius and those with them in Persia (330):  (see also: March 29)
 Zanithas, Lazarus, Maruthas (Marotas), Narses, Elias, Marinus (Mares), Abibus, Sembeeth (Sivsithina), and Sabbas.
  Venerable Hesychios the Theologian of Jerusalem (434), disciple of St. Gregory the Theologian.
 Venerable Hilarion the New, Abbot of Pelekete monastery near Prusa (754)
 Saint Stephen the Confessor and Wonderworker, Abbot of Tryglia (815)  (see also: March 26)
 Hieromartyrs George, Bishop of Zagora, Parodus and Peter, priests, and Martyr Prince Enravota-Boyan (833), of Bulgaria.

Pre-Schism Western saints

 Martyrs Rogatus, Successus and Companions, a group of eighteen martyrs in North Africa.
 Saint Sixtus III (Xystus), Pope of Rome from 432 (440).
 Saint Spes (Speus), an Abbot of Campi in central Italy (ca. 513)
 Saint Gontram (Gunthrammus), a repentant King of Burgundy in France (592)
 Saint Gundelindis (Guendelindis), a daughter of the Duke of Alsace and niece of St Ottilia, whom she succeeded as Abbess of Niedermünster Abbey (ca. 750)
 Saint Tutilo (Tuotilo), a gifted and artistic monk at St Gall Abbey in Switzerland (ca. 915)

Post-Schism Orthodox saints

 Venerable Martyr Eustratius of the Kiev Caves (1097)
 Saint Mstislav, Prince of Vladimir-Suzdal, son of Prince Andrey Bogolyubsky (1173)
 Venerable Hilarion, monk, of Gdov, Pskov (1476)
 Venerable Dionysius the Merciful, Bishop of Larissa (1510)
 Venerable Jonah, Abbot of Klimets Monastery, Olonets (1534)
 Saint John, Bishop of Manglisi, Georgia (1751)

New martyrs and confessors

 New Hieromartyr Nicholas Postnikov, Archpriest, of Timoshkino, Ryazan (1931)
 New Hieromartyr Basil Malinin, Archpriest, of Pereslavl (1938)
 Martyr John Chernoff (1939)
 New Hieromartyr Peter Ochryzko, Priest of Chartoviec, Chełm and Podlasie, Poland (1944)

Other commemorations

 Repose of Abbot Adrian (in schema Alexis) of Konevits Monastery (1812)
 Repose of Blessed Helen of Arzamas, disciple of Abbot Nazarius of Valaam (1820)
 Icon of the Mother of God of "the Sign".

Icon gallery

Notes

References

Sources
 March 28/April 10. Orthodox Calendar (PRAVOSLAVIE.RU).
 April 10 / March 28. HOLY TRINITY RUSSIAN ORTHODOX CHURCH (A parish of the Patriarchate of Moscow).
 March 28. OCA - The Lives of the Saints.
 The Autonomous Orthodox Metropolia of Western Europe and the Americas (ROCOR). St. Hilarion Calendar of Saints for the year of our Lord 2004. St. Hilarion Press (Austin, TX). p. 25.
 March 28. Latin Saints of the Orthodox Patriarchate of Rome.
 The Roman Martyrology. Transl. by the Archbishop of Baltimore. Last Edition, According to the Copy Printed at Rome in 1914. Revised Edition, with the Imprimatur of His Eminence Cardinal Gibbons. Baltimore: John Murphy Company, 1916. p. 89.
Greek Sources
 Great Synaxaristes:  28 ΜΑΡΤΙΟΥ. ΜΕΓΑΣ ΣΥΝΑΞΑΡΙΣΤΗΣ.
  Συναξαριστής. 28 Μαρτίου. ECCLESIA.GR. (H ΕΚΚΛΗΣΙΑ ΤΗΣ ΕΛΛΑΔΟΣ). 
Russian Sources
  10 апреля (28 марта). Православная Энциклопедия под редакцией Патриарха Московского и всея Руси Кирилла (электронная версия). (Orthodox Encyclopedia - Pravenc.ru).
  28 марта (ст.ст.) 10 апреля 2013 (нов. ст.). Русская Православная Церковь Отдел внешних церковных связей. (DECR).

March in the Eastern Orthodox calendar